The Puget Sound AVA is an American Viticultural Area in western Washington State. It is the only AVA in the state of Washington that is located west of the Cascade Mountains.  Note that in 2019 there is a committee working to establish a southwestern WA AVA.

Geography and climate 

The AVA encompasses the entire Puget Sound area from the Canada–US border to just south of Olympia. 

Most of that rainfall occurs in the winter time. Summers are mild, sunny and dry. Irrigation is a necessity in some of the drier locations. The AVA is suited to cool climate varieties such as Madeleine Angevine, Madeline Sylvaner, Müller-Thurgau and Siegerrebe with some clonal varieties of Pinot noir and Pinot gris, Chardonnay and Melon de Bourgogne growing well in warmer locations. Many new varieties showed promise during tests at the Washington State University Mount Vernon Agricultural Research Station circa 2005. Those include Regent, St. Laurent, Zweigelt, Dornfelder and Garanoir. In 2019 we're starting to see several of these varieties are showing up in tasting rooms in the area.

The region is almost entirely within hardiness zone 8b.

History 
One of the earliest recorded plantings in the Puget Sound area was done in 1872 by an American Civil War veteran named Lambert Evans on Stretch Island, near modern-day Allyn-Grapeview.  Evans planted several varieties of Vitis labrusca there.  There are still a few of these "Island Belle" vines surviving (2019) and Hoodsport Winery has produced a wine from them with that name for decades.

Bainbridge Island Vineyard and Winery was established in 1977, their Founder Gerard Bentryn is credited with being the first to establish Vitis vinifera grapes in the Puget Sound area.  Bentryn authored and established the definition of the Puget Sound AVA in 1995.  It is the 4th AVA established in Washington State.  Bentryn is also credited with being instrumental in bringing many of the cool climate varietals in common use today; he worked with Dr. Norton at Washington State University and had them imported from Saanich Farm Experimental Station in Canada, Geisenheim Grape Breeding Institute in Germany, and others.

Wineries 
Although the Puget Sound AVA contains many wineries, most bring in grapes from Eastern Washington.  there are 18 wineries producing wines from Puget Sound AVA grapes.

References

External links 
 Puget Sound Wine Growers Association

American Viticultural Areas
Washington (state) wine
Puget Sound region
1995 establishments in Washington (state)